Mottram is a surname. Notable people with the surname include:

 Buster Mottram, former British tennis player, son of Tony Mottram
 Craig Mottram, Australian distance runner
 Don Mottram, English flavour chemist
 Eric Mottram, English poet
 Heidi Mottram, British chief executive
 James Cecil Mottram (1879–1945), British cancer researcher and naturalist
 Leslie Mottram, Scottish football referee
 Linda Mottram (born 1957), former British professional tennis player, daughter of Tony Mottram
 Paul Mottram, classical and jazz composer
 R.H. Mottram, English writer
 Richard Mottram, British civil servant
 Tony Mottram (1920–2016), British tennis player

See also 
 Mottram St. Andrew, a village in Cheshire
 Mottram in Longdendale, a village in Greater Manchester